Utkinton Hall is a country house to the southeast of the village of Utkinton, Cheshire, England. It is recorded in the National Heritage List for England as a designated Grade I listed building.

History 
The hall originated as a large manor house for the Done family, who were the hereditary wardens of Delamere Forest, and is now a farmhouse. It has a medieval core but most of it dates from the early 17th century. It was partly refaced around 1700 and again in the early 18th century for Sir John Crewe. The hall is built in ashlar red sandstone. Part of the hall has an orange brick façade with red sandstone dressings. It has a Welsh slate roof and brick chimneys. A barn, walls and gatepiers surrounding the hall are listed at Grade II.

James I visited the hall while hunting at Delamere Forest in 1617. Armorial stained glass that was formerly in the hall is now held in the Burrell Collection, Glasgow.

See also

Listed buildings in Utkinton
Grade I listed buildings in Cheshire West and Chester

References

Further reading

Grade I listed buildings in Cheshire
Country houses in Cheshire
Grade I listed houses